Paracymoriza parallelalis is a moth in the family Crambidae. It was described by Sauber in 1902. It is found on Luzon in the Philippines.

References

Acentropinae
Moths described in 1902